The Klausewitz's garden eel (Gorgasia klausewitzi) is an eel in the family Congridae (conger/garden eels). It was described by Jean-Claude Quéro and Luiz Vieria Caldas Saldanha in 1995. It is a marine, tropical eel, which is known from the Indian Ocean, including the Andaman Islands, Réunion, Mauritius, and the Comoros Islands.

Etymology
The fish is named in honor of German ichthyologist Wolfgang Klausewitz garden eel expert, who encouraged the authors to describe this species of eel.

References

Gorgasia
Taxa named by Jean-Claude Quéro
Taxa named by Luiz Vieria Caldas Saldanha
Fish described in 1995